Clane is a barony in County Kildare, Republic of Ireland.

Etymology
Clane derives its name from the town of Clane (Irish Claonadh, "slope"/"incline").

Location

Clane barony is found in northern County Kildare, west of the River Liffey and incorporating much of the Bog of Allen.

History
Clane barony was part of the ancient lands of the Uí Broin before the 13th century.

List of settlements

Below is a list of settlements in Clane barony:
Caragh
Clane
Coill Dubh
Prosperous
Staplestown

References

Baronies of County Kildare